Athletics events at the 1978 Southern Cross Games were held at the Estadio Olímpico Hernando Siles in La Paz, Bolivia in November.  The stadium was one of the first in South America equipped with a synthetic track.  A total of 35 events were contested, 22 by men and 13 by women.  

Best performances were by Luis Schneider from Chile winning four gold medals (100m, 200m, 4x100m relay, 4x400m relay), by native Johnny Pérez from Bolivia winning three gold medals (1500 m, 5000 m, and 3000 m steeplechase), by Ivonne Neddermann from Argentina winning two gold (long jump, 4×100 m relay), two silver (100 m hurdles, pentathlon) and one bronze medal (shot put), and finally by Nancy Vallecilla from Ecuador winning two gold (100 m hurdles, pentathlon), one silver (400 m), and one bronze medal (long jump). She was awarded the unofficial title of "Queen of the Games" (Spanish: Reina de los Juegos).

Medal summary

Medal winners were published in a book written by Argentinian journalist Ernesto Rodríguez III with support of the Argentine Olympic Committee (Spanish: Comité Olímpico Argentino) under the auspices of the Ministry of Education (Spanish: Ministerio de Educación de la Nación) in collaboration with the 
Office of Sports (Spanish: Secretaría de Deporte de la Nación).  Eduardo Biscayart supplied the list of winners and their results.  All results are marked as "affected by altitude" (A), because the stadium in La Paz is situated 3,650 metres above sea level.

Men

Women

Medal table (unofficial)

References

1978 
1978 Southern Cross Games 
Southern Cross
1978 Southern Cross Games